Shah Zileh (also Romanized as Shāh Zīleh and Shāhzilleh; also known as Mehdīyeh and Kalāt-e Maleḵ) is a village in Khusf Rural District, Central District, Khusf County, South Khorasan Province, Iran. At the 2006 census, its population was 465, in 144 families.

References 

Populated places in Khusf County